Oreke Mosheshe is a British actress, TV presenter, blogger and model.

Background

Oreke graduated from Brunel University with a degree in management and law - modelling part-time to pay the bills. With a job in business development lined up, Oreke decided to take a year off after university 'to see the world'. She only got as far as her native North London however, as she was approached by publicity guru Camilla Storey to take up acting full-time. Oreke also studied drama at college, and the Meisner technique with Scott Williams at the Impulse school of acting.

Career

Oreke has appeared in several BBC, ITV and Channel 4 productions. She can also be seen at the end of the year in British comedy 'rabbit fever' which has been voted best British comedy of the year by Toby Young (Tatler.)

Oreke has featured alongside great British actors such as the late Sir John Mills, Lesley Sharp and James Nesbitt as well as established Hollywood stars like Ray Liotta. Her acting roles have taken her to Africa where she guest appeared in popular soap 'Sun City'.

Oreke has modelled for some of the world's leading fashion houses including Matthew Williamson, Vivienne Westwood, Armani and Joseph. She was the face of T-Mobile Web 'n' Walk campaign and has starred in the international Star beer campaign.

Oreke can be seen in several commercials across the world ranging from high fashion to playing a young mum in the new Huggies international campaign.

Film credits

Lights2 - Action Hero, The Shadow (with Marcus Dillistone and Sir John Mills)
Lights2; Return of The Shadow - Action Hero, The Shadow, sequel (with Marcus Dillistone and John Quentin)
Revolver - Foxy: Dancer (with Guy Ritchie)
Planespotting - Nkechi: Prisoner (with Chris Menaul and Francis Hopkinson Granada)
Rabbit Fever - Rude Girl
Double O - Lola: Secret Agent
Johnny English - (with Rowan Atkinson and Peter Howitt)

Television acting

The Lenny Henry Show - Model/Singer (BBC Television)
20 Things To Do Before You're 30 - Sarah (BBC Television)

Television presenting

Live Roulette TV - Sky digital channel 847
Hawaiian Tropics 2004 - International, E Channel
Grab-a-Grand Game Show - Skytele Media
Hawaiian Tropics International - E! Entertainment Channel
Psychic Interactive Show - Skytele Media
Spin and Win - Hollywood TV

Commercial modelling

Africa Kicks - (BBC Television)
Top of the Pops - (BBC Television)
KFC
Orange Mobile
Nestle

Theatre

Round and Round - Wrote and Directed
The End - Solin Woman Show
Cabaret - Charity Tour

Modelling

 Catwalk, House of Fraser
Skin Care/ Fashion, GMTV
Showroom, Armani Collective club 21
Product Launch/Campaign, PlayStation
Mathew Williamson, London Fashion Week
Showroom, Vivienne Westwood
Showroom, Joseph

Music videos

Appleton - "Fantasy"
Million Dan - "Dogs And Sledges"
So Solid Crew - "Rid Wid Us"
Adam F And Li'l Mo - "Where's My…"
t.A.T.u. - "Not Gonna Get Us"

Qualifications

Scott Williams Impulse School of Acting (London)
Ravenscroft College - Three years Theatre Studies
RADA “Unarmed combat course” Led by Bret Young
BBC Intensive Presenting course

Miscellaneous

In 2006, Oreke came fifth in the Miss Great Britain contest.

External links
 EMM News Item
  Live Roulette TV website
  GamingTelly.com Discussion of Gaming channels [offline]
  Oreke's Website[offline]

English television personalities
English female models
English television presenters
Alumni of Brunel University London
Living people
Year of birth missing (living people)